Brian Perry Olson (born March 6, 1973 in Tallahassee, Florida) has been a competitor on four United States Olympic teams in judo: 1996 (under 86 kg), 2000 (under 90 kg), and 2004 (under 90 kg), and 2008. He won the bronze medal in the 1997 World Judo Championships (under 86 kg), and was affiliated with the University of Colorado.

Brian Olson is also a black belt in Brazilian Jiu Jitsu.

References
 
 Brian Olson's birth information
 US Olympic Judo Teams 1964 to present
 

1973 births
Olympic judoka of the United States
American male judoka
Judoka at the 1996 Summer Olympics
Judoka at the 2000 Summer Olympics
Judoka at the 2004 Summer Olympics
Judoka at the 2008 Summer Olympics
Judoka at the 1995 Pan American Games
Judoka at the 1999 Pan American Games
Judoka at the 2003 Pan American Games
Sportspeople from Tallahassee, Florida
University of Colorado alumni
Living people
Pan American Games medalists in judo
Pan American Games bronze medalists for the United States
Medalists at the 1995 Pan American Games
Medalists at the 1999 Pan American Games
Medalists at the 2003 Pan American Games